The Adolfo Suárez Stadium (Spanish: Estadio Adolfo Suárez) is a football stadium located in the city of Ávila, Spain. Owned by the Ayuntamiento de Ávila, Real Ávila CF plays its home fixtures at the stadium. It has a capacity of 6,000.

History 
Named after Adolfo Suárez, prime minister of Spain between 1976 and 1981, it was inaugurated on 12 October 1976, with a friendly fixture between Atlético Madrid and UD Salamanca. Despite a plaque stating otherwise, the then prime minister could not attend to the inauguration, and the former was actually unveiled by civil governor Luis Cuesta Gimeno. Suárez attended the first official fixture, Real Ávila CF vs CD Manzanares, played on 31 October.

In 2019, the dismal state of the facilities (featuring an abandoned velodrome and deteriorated pitch and stands) led to the proposal of renovation requests by Real Ávila.

References 

Buildings and structures in Ávila, Spain
Football venues in Castile and León
Sport in Ávila, Spain